Liban Ali Yarrow is a jurist and military leader from Somalia. He is the Chief of the Supreme Military Court.

Career
On 18 February 2014, Yarrow was appointed interim Chief of the Supreme Military Court of Somalia by presidential decree. He succeeded Hassan Mohamed Hussein Mungab at the position, who had earlier been appointed Governor of the Banaadir region and Mayor of Mogadishu. Yarrow's transitional term ended on 18 May 2014, when Abdurahman Mohamud Turyare was named the new Military Court Chief.

On 24 September 2014, Yarrow was reappointed Chief of the Supreme Military Court, after Turyare was named the new head of the National Intelligence and Security Agency (NISA).

References

Living people
Somalian jurists
Year of birth missing (living people)